Simon Jefferies Golding,  (born 30 March 1946) is a Church of England priest and former Royal Navy chaplain. He was Chaplain of the Fleet, Director General of the Naval Chaplaincy Service and Archdeacon for the Royal Navy from 2000 to 2002.

He was educated at HMS Conway Merchant Navy Cadet School and Lincoln Theological College. He was a Navigation officer in the Merchant Navy then a lieutenant in the Royal Naval Reserve. He was ordained  deacon in 1974, and priest in 1976. After a curacy at St Cuthbert, Wilton he was a Naval Chaplain from 1977 to 2002. He was also an Honorary Chaplain to the Queen from 1997 to 2002.

Footnotes

1947 births
Living people
20th-century English Anglican priests
21st-century English Anglican priests
Chaplains of the Fleet
British Merchant Navy officers
Royal Naval Volunteer Reserve personnel
People educated aboard HMS Conway
Alumni of Lincoln Theological College
Honorary Chaplains to the Queen
Commanders of the Order of the British Empire
Church of England archdeacons (military)
Royal Naval Reserve personnel